The EMD SD30C-ECO is a  C-C diesel-electric locomotive built by EMD. Although similar to the EMD SD32ECO, the SD30C-ECO follows the Canadian Pacific Railway's request for crashworthiness and EPA emission standards with the "C" in the designation denoting crashworthiness of the cab, frame, and fuel tank. CP requested relaxed emission standards (Tier 0+ instead of Tier 2) to cut costs.

Cores for the locomotives come from CPs fleet of EMD SD40-2s. The frames, trucks, and internal components are reused while a new (standard) cab, designed and constructed by EMD, and a fuel tank is built new for each unit. With the increased emissions requirements, the locomotives feature flared radiators similar to those on the EMD SD45 to house additional cooling equipment. The locomotives have a snoot nose to house additional electronics, and all lighting with the exception of the headlights and ditch lights are LED.

Owners
A total of 50 SD30C-ECOs have been built for Canadian Pacific in 2 orders. The first order was for 20 locomotives numbered 5000-5019 and the second order was for an additional 30 locomotives numbered 5020-5049.

References 

C-C locomotives
SD30C-ECO
Rebuilt locomotives
Standard gauge locomotives of the United States
Railway locomotives introduced in 2013
Diesel-electric locomotives of the United States
Diesel-electric locomotives of Canada
Standard gauge locomotives of Canada